Murder at 3 a.m. is a 1953 British crime film directed by Francis Searle and starring Dennis Price, Peggy Evans and Rex Garner. The screenplay of this second feature involves a Scotland Yard detective who investigates a series of attacks on women.

Cast
 Dennis Price as Inspector Peter Lawton
 Peggy Evans as Joan Lawton
 Rex Garner as Sgt. Bill Todd
 Arnold Bell as McMann
 Greta Mayaro as Lena
 Philip Saville as Edward/Jim King
 Leonard Sharp as Old Skip
 Nora Gordon as Nanna
 Renee Goddard as Lady Branstead
 Arthur Lovegrove as Inspector Cobb
 Daphne Maddox as Victim
 Robert Weeden as Constable
 John Davis as Transmitting Constable

Critical reception
To-Day's Cinema called it an "efficient specimen" of the crime thriller.

References

External links

1953 films
British crime films
1953 crime films
1950s English-language films
Films directed by Francis Searle
Films set in London
British black-and-white films
Films scored by Eric Spear
1950s British films